Rugby School Thailand (RST) is a private co-educational British international school in Bang Lamung District, Chonburi, Thailand. It is a day and boarding school similar to its 453-year-old sister school, Rugby School in the UK. Rugby School Thailand offers Britain's national curriculum to both Thai and international students.

In September 2017, the Prep and Pre-Prep school opened for Pre-Nursery (2 year-olds) up to Year 6 (10/11 year-olds). Years 7-13 opened in September 2018, with boarding available for Year 3 students and above.

History
In 2015, Nigel Westlake, former headmaster of Packwood Haugh School and Brambletye School, joined with Wisdom Enterprise (owned by the Teepsuwan family) to set up a new international school in Thailand. With over 30 years experience in the UK independent sector, with 15 of those as head, Mr. Westlake serves as the founding headmaster of the new project.

After presenting their plans and receiving positive feedback from 14 schools in the UK, the founders chose to partner with Rugby School 

The 80-acre campus opened for pre-prep and prep school in September 2017 and opened for senior school in September 2018.

On the 12th of September 2021, Rugby School Thailand opened the first 'school sandbox' in Thailand after working with the ISAT to gain approval from the Ministry of Education and the Ministry of Public Health. This allowed for the reopening of the school amidst the COVID-19 pandemic, which allowed students to return to school via a boarding program by taking regular antigen tests and the implementation of rigorous safety measures within the school grounds. Out of 258 international schools in Thailand, the school is only 1 out of 5 that have opened a boarding bubble to offer face-to-face teaching.

Curriculum
Rugby School Thailand offers the UK National Curriculum, supplemented by selected components of the British Private School Curriculum, for key stages 0-2 from Pre-Nursery up to Year 6 (ages 2–10).

In September 2018, the school opened with 145 students for key stages 3–5 (ages 12–18) and also offer the internationally recognised qualifications IGCSEs, and A-Levels. The school will eventually be able to accommodate roughly 1,250 pupils.

Boarding
Boarding at Rugby School Thailand began in September 2018 and is available to children from years 5–13.

Currently, there are three different boarding options:

 Part boarding - Students aged 10-13 years old may board for up to three fixed nights per week.
 Weekly boarding - Weekly boarders stay at school all week during term-time (except half-term), and head home on Friday or Saturday afternoon for the weekends. 
 Full boarding - Full boarders stay at school all week during term and enjoy the full weekend programme. They will be able to go home at leave weekends or over half-term.

Fees
Tuition fees range from 470,000 to 869,000 baht per year. Annual Boarding fees are 248,500 baht for Part Boarding, 364,300 baht for Weekly Boarding and 430,500 baht for Full Boarding.

Campus
At the 80-acre campus, facilities include:

References

Buildings and structures in Chonburi province
International schools in Thailand
Educational institutions established in 2017
2017 establishments in Thailand